First Lieutenant Charles Rudolph d'Olive was a World War I flying ace, credited with five aerial victories. He was the last World War I aviator to be declared an ace, in 1963.

World War I
Although born in Alabama, d'Olive later lived in Cedar Falls, Iowa. He enlisted into aviation service in Memphis during Bloody April 1917. He trained in France, and was posted to the 93rd Aero Squadron on 23 August 1918 as a SPAD S.XIII pilot. He scored the new unit's first victory on 12 September. The following day, he shot down three Fokker D.VIIs, two in conjunction with George Willard Furlow; it was an exploit that earned d'Olive the Distinguished Service Cross. He scored once more, on 18 October 1918. Ten days later, he was transferred to the 141st Aero Squadron as a Flight commander.

Post World War I

When d'Olive returned home, he went into business. For reasons that remain murky, d'Olive would not be officially recognized as an ace until 1963. He died of cancer on 20 July 1974.

In 2016, the USAF Air Force Reserve Command Historian Office commissioned a painting of d'Olive's three-victory flight, unveiling it at an event at the National Museum of the United States Air Force on October 1, 2016.

A number of historic items and documents from d'Olive's military service are on display at the 93d Bomb Squadron offices at Barksdale Air Force Base, Louisiana. In 2018, his daughter, Susan d'Olive Mozena, flew on a B-52 training mission with the 93rd in honor of his World War I achievements.

Honors and awards citations
Distinguished Service Cross (DSC)

The Distinguished Service Cross is presented to Charles Rudolph d'Olive, First Lieutenant (Air Service), U.S. Army, for extraordinary heroism in action near St. Benoit, France, September 12, 1918, First Lieutenant D'Olive, in conjunction with another American pilot, engaged and fought five enemy planes. Outnumbered and fighting against tremendous odds, he shot down three enemy planes and outfought the entire enemy formation.

See also

 List of World War I flying aces from the United States

References

Bibliography
 American Aces of World War I. Norman Franks, Harry Dempsey. Osprey Publishing, 2001. , .

1896 births
1974 deaths
People from Clarke County, Alabama
Aviators from Alabama
People from Cedar Falls, Iowa
Recipients of the Distinguished Service Cross (United States)
American World War I flying aces
Burials at Vine Street Hill Cemetery